Club Africain Women's Handball Club (Arabic: النادي الإفريقي لكرة اليد للسيدات, English:  African Club or CA) is a Tunisian handball team based in Capital Tunis, that plays in Tunisian Handball League Division A.

Honours

National titles
 Tunisian Handball League 28 :
Champions : 1962–63, 1966–67, 1967–68, 1968–69, 1971–72, 1972–73, 1973–74, 1974–75, 1975–76, 1976–77, 1977–78, 1978–79, 1979–80, 1980–81, 1981–82, 1982–83, 1983–84, 1984–85, 1985–86, 1986–87, 1987–88, 1992–93, 1993–94, 2015–16, 2016–17, 2018–19, 2019–20, 2020–21

 Tunisian Handball Cup 27 :
Champions : 1966–67, 1968–69, 1970–71, 1972–73, 1973–74, 1974–75, 1976–76, 1977–78, 1978–79, 1979–80, 1980–81, 1981–82, 1982–83, 1983–84, 1984–85, 1985–86, 1986–87, 1987–88, 1988–89, 1990–91, 1991–92, 1992–93, 1993–94, 2015–16, 2016–17, 2020–21, 2021–22

Regional titles
 Arab Women's Handball Championship of Champions 2 :

Champions : 2014, 2021

 Arab Women's Handball Championship of Winners' Cup 1 :

Champions : 2017

Team

Current squad

Notable players
  Raja Toumi

See also
Club Africain (football)
Club Africain (basketball)
Club Africain (handball)

References

External links
Official website 
Handball Page 
Club Africain on Instagram

Tunisian handball clubs
Handball clubs established in 1956
1956 establishments in Tunisia
Sport in Tunis